Jocivalter Liberato  (born 6 May 1979), known as just Jocivalter, is a Brazilian footballer who plays as a midfielder.

Biography

Early career
Born in Foz do Iguaçu, Paraná, Jocivalter started his career at São Paulo state club Guarani, which he played twice in 1999 Copa do Brasil and 1999 Campeonato Brasileiro Série A.

Portugal
In 2001, he was signed by Liga de Honra club Aves, which he played one season and scored 8 league goals. In 2002–03 season, he was signed by Primeira Liga club Boavista F.C. The club later sold a portion of the economic rights of Jocivalter to an investment fund for cash and would gave the fund that portion of transfer revenue. He scored in his European debut against Hibernians, a 3–3 draw. He also played 6 matches in 2002–03 UEFA Cup, scored a brace.

In 2004–05 season he was loaned to Liga de Honra for Varzim. In January 2006 he returned to Brazil, signed a 1-year contract with Portuguesa and played in 2006 Campeonato Paulista scored 1 goal. In August 2006 he returned to Portugal for Aves.

Cyprus and late career
In 2007–08 season he left for Cyprus, played for Alki Larnaca and Atromitos Yeroskipou. In 2009–10 season, he returned to Portugal again, for Portuguese Second Division club Moreirense.

International career
Jocivalter took part in the 1999 South American Youth Championship.

References

External links
 
 
 Futpedia 

1979 births
Living people
Brazilian footballers
Brazil under-20 international footballers
Primeira Liga players
Cypriot First Division players
Guarani FC players
C.D. Aves players
Boavista F.C. players
Associação Portuguesa de Desportos players
Alki Larnaca FC players
Atromitos Yeroskipou players
Moreirense F.C. players
Association football midfielders
Brazilian expatriate footballers
Expatriate footballers in Portugal
Expatriate footballers in Cyprus
Brazilian expatriate sportspeople in Portugal
Brazilian expatriate sportspeople in Cyprus
People from Foz do Iguaçu
Sportspeople from Paraná (state)